Hotchner is a surname. Notable people with the surname include:

A. E. Hotchner (1917–2020), American writer
Holly Hotchner, American museum director
John Hotchner, American philatelist and philatelic writer

Fictional characters
Aaron Hotchner, a character in the television series Criminal Minds